"From Me to You" is a song by The Beatles.

From Me to You may also refer to:
 From Me to You, a 2012 EP by Susanna Hoffs
 "From Me to You", a song composed by Fabian Andre
 From Me to You (Yui album), 2006
 From Me to You (Crunchy Black album), 2007
 From Me to You (George Duke album), 1977
 From Me to You (Quadeca album), 2021
 Kimi ni Todoke: From Me to You, a shōjo manga by Karuho Shiina
 "From Me to You", a song by Janis Ian on her album Between the Lines, 1975